is a railway station in the city of Annaka, Gunma, Japan, operated by the East Japan Railway Company (JR East).

Lines

Station layout
The station has two opposed side platforms connected to the station building by a footbridge. The station is unattended.

Platforms

History
Matsuida Station opened on 15 October 1885. With the privatization of the Japanese National Railways (JNR) on 1 April 1987, the station came under the control of JR East.

Passenger statistics
In fiscal 2017, the station was used by an average of 543 passengers daily (boarding passengers only).

Surrounding area
 Usui River
 Gunma Prefectural Matsuida High School

See also
 List of railway stations in Japan

References

External links

 JR East station information 

Shin'etsu Main Line
Railway stations in Gunma Prefecture
Railway stations in Japan opened in 1885
Stations of East Japan Railway Company
Annaka, Gunma